Byron Keith Lee (born September 8, 1964) is a former American football linebacker who played for two seasons in the National Football League (NFL). He played college football for Ohio State. He was drafted by the New Jersey Generals in the 1986 USFL Territorial Draft, but did not sign with the team, as he was also drafted by the Philadelphia Eagles in the seventh round (176th overall) of the 1986 NFL Draft. He was waived by the Eagles during final roster cuts on August 19, 1986, but was re-signed on October 15. He played for the Eagles in 1986 and 1987, and was an offseason member of the Los Angeles Raiders in 1988. He played for the Columbus Thunderbolts of the Arena Football League (AFL) in 1991.

References

1964 births
Living people
American football linebackers
Players of American football from Ohio
Ohio State Buckeyes football players
Philadelphia Eagles players
Los Angeles Raiders players
Cleveland Thunderbolts players